Mary Stella Arach-Amoko is a Ugandan judge, who has served as a Justice of the Supreme Court of Uganda, since 20 June 2013.

Career
Arach-Amoko served in the Uganda Attorney General's chambers from 1979 until 1997, rising from a state attorney to commissioner for civil litigation. In 1997, she was appointed a High Court judge, serving in that capacity until 2010.

Justice Stella Arach-Amoko served at the East African Court of Justice, from 2006 until 2008, as a judge, and from 2008 until 2013, as a "Deputy Principal Judge of the First Instance Division". In 2010, she was one of the candidates considered by the Judicial Services Commission, for appointment as the Chief Justice of Uganda.

Between 15 April 2018 until 14 April 2020, Justice Arach-Amoko served as the Chairperson of the nine-member, Management Committee of Uganda's Law Development Centre. In 2010 she was appointed to the Court of Appeal of Uganda.

In her career on the bench, Justice Arach-Amoko has handled many election cases. In 2006 she dismissed the petition in which National Resistance Movement’s Francis Babu had challenged Erias Lukwago’s victory as Member of Parliament for Kampala Central Division. In 2012, at the Court of Appeal, she wrote the majority opinion that nullified NRM's Faisal Kikulukunyu's victory as the Member of Parliament for Butambala County. The ruling benefited Muhammad Muwanga Kivumbi, of the Democratic Party.

Family
Justice Arach-Amoko is married to Ambassador Idule Amoko who, as of 2017, was serving as the Deputy Head of Mission at the Uganda Embassy in Addis Ababa, Ethiopia.

Stella Arach-Amoko is also the mother of chess player Ivy Claire Amoko, the first woman to become a Woman Fide Master in East Africa.

See also
 Judiciary of Uganda

References

External links
 Called to the bench: here are the candidates As of 15 May 2013.

20th-century Ugandan judges
21st-century Ugandan judges
1954 births
Living people
Ugandan women judges
Makerere University alumni
Law Development Centre alumni
People from Northern Region, Uganda
Justices of the Supreme Court of Uganda
20th-century women judges
21st-century women judges